Rogue River may refer to:

Places in the United States
 Rogue River (Michigan), a river in Michigan
 Rogue River (Oregon), a river in Oregon
 Rogue River (South Yamhill River), a river in Oregon
 Rogue River, Oregon, a city in Oregon

Other uses 
 Rogue River (tribe), a Native American tribe in Southern Oregon
 "Rogue River" (Jericho episode), an episode of Jericho
 Rogue River (film), a 1951 film by John Rawlins
 Rogue River (train), a named passenger train of the United States

See also
The Battle of Rogue River a 1954 Western film
Rogue River Wars, a series of wars between the United States and the Rogue River tribe in Oregon
Rouge River (disambiguation)